Lycosomus is a monotypic beetle genus in the family Cerambycidae described by Per Olof Christopher Aurivillius in 1903. Its only species, Lycosomus mirabilis, was described by the same author in the same year.

References

Dorcasominae
Beetles described in 1903
Monotypic beetle genera